Jean Umansky is a French sound engineer. He was nominated for an Academy Award in the category Best Sound for the film Amélie. He has worked on over 50 films since 1980.

Selected filmography
 Amélie (2001)

References

External links

Year of birth missing (living people)
Living people
French audio engineers
Best Sound Genie and Canadian Screen Award winners